Fonticella is a strictly anaerobic, moderately thermophilic, halotolerant and non-motile bacterial genus from the family of Clostridiaceae with one known species (Fonticella tunisiensis). Fonticella tunisiensis has been isolated from water from a hot spring in Tunisia.

References

Clostridiaceae
Bacteria genera
Monotypic bacteria genera
Taxa described in 2013